Abelitz may refer to:

 Abelitz (river), a river in East Frisia, Germany
 Abelitz (Südbrookmerland), a village in Südbrookmerland, East Frisia, Germany